Henry Childs (April 16, 1951 – June 3, 2016) was an American professional football player who was a tight end in the National Football League (NFL) for the Atlanta Falcons, New Orleans Saints, Los Angeles Rams, and the Green Bay Packers. He was a Pro Bowl player in 1979.

Childs was inducted into the New Orleans Saints Hall of Fame in 1994.

On June 3, 2016, he had a massive heart attack while driving in his car and was pronounced dead at the age of 65 in Thomasville, Georgia.

References

1951 births
2016 deaths
American football tight ends
Kansas State Wildcats football players
Atlanta Falcons players
National Conference Pro Bowl players
New Orleans Saints players
Los Angeles Rams players
Green Bay Packers players
People from Thomasville, Georgia